Drummond station served Drummond in County Londonderry in Northern Ireland.

The Londonderry and Coleraine Railway opened the station on 1 July 1855, on a short horse-drawn tram from  station.

It closed on 1 October 1855.

Routes

References

Disused railway stations in County Londonderry
Railway stations opened in 1855
Railway stations closed in 1855
1855 establishments in Ireland
Railway stations in Northern Ireland opened in the 19th century